Fame is an unincorporated community in McIntosh County, Oklahoma, United States.

References

Unincorporated communities in McIntosh County, Oklahoma
Unincorporated communities in Oklahoma